1986–87 was the 12th season that Division 1 operated as the second tier of ice hockey in Sweden, below the top-flight Elitserien (now the Swedish Hockey League).

Format
Division 1 was divided into four starting groups of 10 teams each. The top two teams in each group qualified for the Allsvenskan, while the remaining eight teams had to compete in a qualifying round. The teams were given zero to seven bonus points based on their finish in the first round. The top team from each qualifying round qualified for the playoffs. The last-place team in each of the qualifying groups had to play in a relegation series in an attempt to avoid relegation to Division 2.

Of the eight teams in the Allsvenskan, the top team qualified directly for promotion to the Elitserien (now the SHL), while the second place team qualified for the Kvalserien, which offered another opportunity to be promoted. The third to sixth place teams in the Allsvenskan qualified for the playoffs. The two playoff winners qualified for the Kvalserien, in which the first-place team qualified for the following Elitserien season.

Regular season

Northern Group

First round

Qualification round

Western Group

First round

Qualification round

Eastern Group

First round

Qualification round

Southern Group

First round

Qualification round

Allsvenskan

Playoffs

First round 
 Västra Frölunda HC - Väsby IK 0:2 (4:5 OT, 1:6)
 Västerås IK - IF Troja-Ljungby 2:1 (10:2, 7:8, 6:2)
 Rögle BK - Huddinge IK 1:2 (2:4, 4:2, 3:5)
 Hammarby IF - Piteå HC 2:0 (4:2, 6:5 OT)

Second round 
 Västerås IK - Huddinge IK 2:1 (6:5, 3:6, 6:1)
 Väsby IK - Hammarby IF 2:1 (3:2 OT, 2:6, 7:2)

Elitserien promotion

External links 
Season on hockeyarchives.info

Swedish Division I seasons
2
Swe